Patrick Otte (born October 22, 1991 in Hilversum, Netherlands) is a Dutch footballer.

Career

Youth
Otte moved with his family to California at a young age and attended IMG Academy for 2 years before joining the academy of storied English side Middlesbrough for 3 years.

Professional
Otte signed his first professional contract in 2011 when he signed with the Fort Lauderdale Strikers of the North American Soccer League. He made his professional debut on April 9, in a game against FC Edmonton, and scored his first professional goal on May 11 in a 4-2 loss to the Carolina RailHawks. After a promising start to the season, Otte injured his ACL in June and was ruled out for the duration of the season. In December 2011, the Strikers announced that Otte's option had been picked up and he would be returning for a second season with the club.

On April 14, 2012 in a match against the Minnesota Stars, Otte made his first competitive appearance for the Strikers in nearly a year, coming off of the bench for Leopoldo Morales in the 73rd minute.

On February 5, 2013, Otte played for the Leeds United development squad v Wigan Athletic as part of a trial period with the Yorkshire club.

Otte signed with the Jacksonville Armada FC of the North American Soccer League on February 12, 2016 and made his first start for the club in a preseason match against MLS side New York Red Bulls on February 27, 2016.

References

External links
 Fort Lauderdale bio

1991 births
Living people
American soccer players
Dutch emigrants to the United States
North American Soccer League players
USL League Two players
Fort Lauderdale Strikers players
Ventura County Fusion players
Jacksonville Armada FC players
Sportspeople from Hilversum
Association football midfielders
Association football defenders
Footballers from North Holland